TBPS (tert-butylbicyclophosphorothionate) is a bicyclic phosphate convulsant. It is an extremely potent GABA receptor antagonist.

See also
IPTBO
EBOB

References

Bicyclic phosphates
Convulsants
Neurotoxins
Tert-butyl compounds
Organothiophosphate esters
Oxygen heterocycles
GABAA receptor negative allosteric modulators